Roxton Pond is a municipality in the Canadian province of Quebec, located within La Haute-Yamaska Regional County Municipality. The population as of the 2021 Canadian Census was 4,224. The municipality was created in 1997 with the merger of the Parish and the Village of Roxton Pond.

Demographics

Population
Population trend:

''(+) Amalgamation of the Parish and the Village of Roxton Pond on December 17, 1997.'

Language
Mother tongue language (2021)

See also
List of municipalities in Quebec
Municipal history of Quebec

References

External links

Municipalities in Quebec
Incorporated places in La Haute-Yamaska Regional County Municipality